Gigliola is a feminine Italian given name. Notable people with the name include:

Gigliola Cinquetti (born 1947), Italian singer and television presenter
Gigliola Frazzoni (1923–2016), Italian opera singer
Gigliola Staffilani (born 1966), American mathematician
Gigliola da Carrara (1379–1416), Marchioness of Ferrara

Italian feminine given names